The Impossible Years is a 1965 comedy play written by Robert Fisher and Arthur Marx, son of comedian Groucho Marx. After two previews, the Broadway production, directed by Arthur Storch, opened on October 13, 1965, at the Playhouse Theatre, where it ran for 670 performances. The original cast included Alan King, Sudie Bond, Bert Convy, Neva Small, and Scott Glenn. Ed McMahon temporarily assumed the role of Dr. Jack Kingsley for eight performances from January 17, 1966, to January 22, 1966, so Alan King could honor a previously scheduled Miami night club engagement.

On August 22, 1966, Sam Levene replaced Alan King in the starring role of Dr. Jack Kingsley, a psychiatrist, in the Broadway production of The Impossible Years, performing the role for 322 performances until the show closed May 27, 1967 at the Playhouse Theatre. After the Broadway production closed, Sam Levene starred in the first U.S. national company production of The Impossible Years and performed the hit comedy for the duration of 1967 until March 10, 1968, when the production starring Sam Levene closed at the Morris A. Mechanic Theatre in Baltimore, Maryland. National tour stops included performances at New York's Mineola Theatre; Paper Mill Playhouse in Milburn, New Jersey; The Playhouse Theater in Wilmington, Delaware; Royal Alexandria Theatre in Toronto, Canada; Detroit, Michigan; Shubert Theatre, Cincinnati, Ohio; The National Theatre in Washington, D.C.

The play was adapted into a 1968 film of the same name starring David Niven, Lola Albright, Chad Everett, and Cristina Ferrare.

Plot
The comedy revolves around Jonathan Kingsley, a teaching psychiatrist at the local university, his wife, and their two teenage daughters. Complications arise when the older one develops an active interest in the opposite sex, and her younger, impressionable sister begins to emulate her misadventures.

Film adaptation

References

External links

 
 
 
Review of film at The New York Times

1965 plays
American plays adapted into films
Broadway plays